The Variable Man is a collection of science fiction stories by American writer Philip K. Dick.  It was first published by Ace Books in 1957.  The stories had originally appeared in the magazines Space Science Fiction, Fantastic Universe and Galaxy Science Fiction

Contents

 "The Variable Man", 1953
 "Second Variety", 1953
 "The Minority Report", 1955
 "Autofac", 1955
 "A World of Talent", 1954

References

1956 short story collections
Short story collections by Philip K. Dick
Ace Books books